The 2007 Nigerian Senate election in Abia State was held on 21 April 2007, to elect members of the Nigerian Senate to represent Abia State. Nkechi J Nwaogu representing Abia Central and Eyinnaya Abaribe representing Abia South won on the platform of People's Democratic Party while Uche Chukwumerije representing Abia North won on the platform of the Progressive Peoples Alliance.

Overview

Summary

Results

Abia Central 
The election was won by Nkechi Nwaogu of the Peoples Democratic Party (Nigeria).

Abia South 
The election was won by Eyinnaya Abaribe of the Peoples Democratic Party (Nigeria).

Abia Central 
The election was won by Uche Chukwumerije of the Progressive Peoples Alliance.

References

April 2007 events in Nigeria
Abia State Senate elections
Abi